Diyarbekir Province may refer to:
 Diyarbekir Vilayet
 Diyarbekir Eyalet